Daniela Menegon (born 19 June 1977) is a Swazi swimmer. She competed in the women's 800 metre freestyle event at the 1996 Summer Olympics. She was the first woman to represent Swaziland at the Olympics.

References

External links
 

1977 births
Living people
Swazi female swimmers
Olympic swimmers of Eswatini
Swimmers at the 1996 Summer Olympics
Place of birth missing (living people)
Swazi female freestyle swimmers